During the first administrative division of independent Greece in 1833–1836 and again from 1845 until their abolition  with the Kallikratis reform in 2010, the prefectures were the country's main administrative unit. They are now defunct, and have been approximately replaced by regional units.

They are called departments in ISO 3166-2:GR and by the United Nations Group of Experts on Geographical Names.

The prefectures were the second-degree organization of local government, grouped into 13 regions or (before 1987) 10 geographical departments, and in turn divided into provinces and comprising a number of communities and municipalities. The prefectures became self-governing entities in 1994, when the first prefectural-level elections took place. The prefects were previously appointed by the government. By 2010, their number had risen to 51, of which one, the Attica Prefecture, where more than a third of the country's population resided, was further subdivided into four prefecture-level administrations (νομαρχίες, sing. νομαρχία). In addition, there were three super-prefectures (υπερνομαρχίες, sing. υπερνομαρχία) controlling two or more prefectures. 

With the Kallikratis reform, which entered into force on 1 January 2011, the prefectures were abolished. Many, especially in the mainland, were retained in the form of regional units (περιφερειακές ενότητες) within the empowered regions, which largely took over the prefectures' administrative role.

Organization 
The current "Prefectural Self-Governments" were formed in 1994 and replaced the previous prefectures, whose councils and prefects were appointed by the government.

Prefectures are governed by a Prefectural Council (νομαρχιακό συμβούλιο) made up of 21 to 37 members, led by the Prefect (νομάρχης) and presided by a Council President (πρόεδρος).

Other organs of the prefectures are:
 The Prefectural Committee, consisted of the Prefect or an assistant appointed by him and 4 to 6 members, elected by the Prefectural Council.
 The Provincial Council and
 The Eparchos (Sub-prefect, έπαρχος).

Super-prefectures have their own organs (Council, Committee and Super-prefect).

Prefectural councillors are elected via public election every four years. Three-fifths of all seats go to the combination winning a majority and two-fifths of the seats go to remaining parties based on a proportional system. Prefect becomes the president of the victorious electoral combination. Electoral is a combination which attains more than 42% in the first round of the prefectural elections. If no combination passes this threshold, a second round takes place between the two combinations that took the most votes in the first round

Duties 
The State ultimately oversees the actions of local governments, including the prefectures, but the Constitution of Greece and the Code of Prefectural Self-Government still provide communities and municipalities with legal control over the administration of their designated areas.

The Code of Prefectural Self-Government does not include a non-restrictive list of prefectural duties, but a general rule, according to which the newly formed Prefectural Self-Governments have all the duties of the previous prefectures, which are related to their local affairs. Nonetheless, the affairs of "(central) state administration" belonging to the prefects before 1994 are now exerted by the Presidents of the Regions (περιφερειάρχης). The current Prefectural Self-Governments have kept the "local affairs of prefectureal level" not belonging to the "(central) state administration".

With certain laws specific affairs of certain ministries were transferred to the Prefectural Self-Governments (sanitary committees, urban-planning services etc.).

List of prefectures

History
The following prefectures have been part of the Greek state since independence:

Notes:
 Many of the prefectures were originally combined in pairs:
 Attica and Boeotia formed the Attica and Boeotia Prefecture
 Phthiotis Prefecture and Phocis Prefecture formed the Phthiotis and Phocis Prefecture (in 1833–1836 the Phocis and Locris Prefecture)
 Corinthia Prefecture and Argolis Prefecture formed Argolis and Corinthia Prefecture
 Achaea Prefecture and Elis Prefecture formed the Achaea and Elis Prefecture
 Aetolia-Acarnania originally also included Evrytania. Unlike the rest mentioned above, the prefecture never broke up into two prefectures, thus being the only one left with a composite appellation.
 Messenia originally included the southern half of what is now Elis.
 Laconia originally included the southern-eastern half of what is now Messinia.
 Euboea originally included the Sporades, which now belong to Magnesia.
 The territory of Phthiotis Prefecture did not originally include the Domokos Province, which was part of Thessaly (under Ottoman rule until 1881). The area currently constituting the Domokos Province of the Fthiotis Prefecture only became a part of the Greek state in general, and of Phthiotis in particular, after the annexation of Thessaly to Greece in 1881.
 Arcadia Prefecture and the Cyclades Prefecture are the only prefectures to have their borders unchanged since independence.
 The capital of Argolis Prefecture, Nafplion was the first capital of the modern Greek state (1828–1834), before the move of the capital to Athens by King Otto.

There were several short-lived prefectures in areas of present Albania and Turkey, during the Greek occupation of those areas during World War I and the Greco-Turkish War (1919–1922) respectively:

 Argyrokastron (1915–1916), in Northern Epirus (southern Albania)
 Korytsa (1915–1916), in Northern Epirus (southern Albania)
 Adrianople (1920–1922), in Eastern Thrace (European Turkey)
 Kallipolis (1920–1922), in Eastern Thrace (European Turkey)
 Rhaedestos (1920–1922), in Eastern Thrace (European Turkey)
 Saranta Ekklisies (1920–1922), in Eastern Thrace (European Turkey)

See also 
 ISO 3166-2:GR

Notes

External links 

 
 

 
Former subdivisions of Greece
Prefectures
Greece geography-related lists